Primatology is the scientific study of primates. It is a diverse discipline at the boundary between mammalogy and anthropology, and researchers can be found in academic departments of anatomy, anthropology, biology, medicine, psychology, veterinary sciences and zoology, as well as in animal sanctuaries, biomedical research facilities, museums and zoos. Primatologists study both living and extinct primates in their natural habitats and in laboratories by conducting field studies and experiments in order to understand aspects of their evolution and behavior.

Sub-disciplines
As a science, primatology has many different sub-disciplines which vary in terms of theoretical and methodological approaches to the subject used in researching extant primates and their extinct ancestors.

There are two main centers of primatology, Western primatology and Japanese primatology. These two divergent disciplines stem from the unique cultural backgrounds and philosophies that went into their founding. Although, fundamentally, both Western and Japanese primatology share many of the same principles, the areas of their focus in primate research and their methods of obtaining data differ widely.

Western primatology

Origins
Western primatology stems primarily from research by North American and European scientists. Early primate study focused primarily on medical research, but some scientists also conducted "civilizing" experiments on chimpanzees in order to gauge both primate intelligence and the limits of their brainpower.

Theory
The study of primatology looks at the biological and psychological aspects of non-human primates. The focus is on studying the common links between humans and primates. Practitioners believe that by understanding our closest animal relatives, we might better understand the nature shared with our ancestors.

Methods
Primatology is a science. The general belief is that the scientific observation of nature must be either extremely limited, or completely controlled. Either way, the observers must be neutral to their subjects. This allows for data to be unbiased and for the subjects to be uninfluenced by human interference.

There are three methodological approaches in primatology: field study, the more realistic approach; laboratory study, the more controlled approach; and semi-free ranging, where primate habitat and wild social structure is replicated in a captive setting.

Field study is done in natural environments, in which scientific observers watch primates in their natural habitat.

Laboratory study is done in controlled lab settings. In lab settings, scientists are able to perform controlled experimentation on the learning capabilities and behavioral patterns of the animals.

In semi-free ranging studies, scientists are able to watch how primates might act in the wild but have easier access to them, and the ability to control their environments. Such facilities include the Living Links Center at the Yerkes National Primate Research Center in Georgia, US and the Elgin Center at Lion Country Safari in Florida, US.

All types of primate study in the Western methodology are meant to be neutral. Although there are certain Western primatologists who do more subjective research, the emphasis in this discipline is on the objective.

Early field primatology tended to focus on individual researchers. Researchers such as Dian Fossey and Jane Goodall and Birute Galdikas are examples of this. In 1960, Jane Goodall traveled to the forest at Gombe Stream in Tanzania where her determination and skill allowed for her to observe behaviors of the chimpanzees that no researcher had seen prior. Chimpanzees used tools made from twigs to extract termites from their nests. Additionally, Dian Fossey's work conducted at the Karisoke Research station in Rwanda proved the possibility of habituation among the mountain gorillas. Fossey learned that female gorillas are often transferred between groups and gorillas eat their own dung to recycle nutrients. The third "trimate", Birute Galdikas, spent over 12 years becoming habituated to the orangutans in Borneo, Indonesia. Galdikas utilized statistics and modern data collection to conclude her 1978 doctoral thesis regarding orangutan behavior and interactions.

Notable Western primatologists

 Jeanne Altmann
 Irwin S. Bernstein
 Sarah Blaffer Hrdy
 Christophe Boesch
 Geoffrey Bourne
 Josep Call
 C. R. Carpenter
 Colin Chapman
 Dorothy Cheney (scientist)
 Charles Darwin
 Frans de Waal
 Thomas Defler
 Alejandro Estrada
 Linda Fedigan
 Dian Fossey
 Agustin Fuentes
 Birutė Galdikas
 Paul Garber
 Richard Lynch Garner
 Jane Goodall
 Colin Groves
 Harry Harlow
 Philip Hershkovitz
 Alison Jolly
 Nadezhda Ladygina-Kohts
 Louis Leakey
 Eugène Nielen Marais
 Robert D. Martin
 Emil Wolfgang Menzel, Jr.
 Russell Mittermeier
 John R. Napier
 Carlos A. Peres
 Anne E. Russon
 Jordi Sabater Pi
 Robert Sapolsky
 Carel van Schaik
 Robert Seyfarth (scientist)
 Meredith Small
 Barbara Smuts
 Craig Stanford
 Karen B. Strier
 Robert W. Sussman
 Michael Tomasello
 Sherwood Washburn
 David P. Watts
 Richard Wrangham

Japanese primatology

Origins

The discipline of Japanese primatology was developed out of animal ecology. It is mainly credited to Kinji Imanishi and Junichiro Itani. Imanishi was an animal ecologist who began studying wild horses before focusing more on primate ecology. He helped found the Primate Research Group in 1950. Junichiro was a renowned anthropologist and a professor at Kyoto University. He is a co-founder of the Primate Research Institute and the Centre for African Area Studies.

Theory

The Japanese discipline of primatology tends to be more interested in the social aspects of primates. Social evolution and anthropology are of primary interest to them. The Japanese theory believes that studying primates will give us insight into the duality of human nature: individual self vs. social self.

One particular Japanese primatologist, Kawai Masao, introduced the concept of kyokan. This was the theory that the only way to attain reliable scientific knowledge was to attain a mutual relation, personal attachment and shared life with the animal subjects. Though Kawai is the only Japanese primatologist associated with the use of this term, the underlying principle is part of the foundation of Japanese primate research.

Methods
Japanese primatology is a carefully disciplined subjective science. It is believed that the best data comes through identification with your subject. Neutrality is eschewed in favour of a more casual atmosphere, where researcher and subject can mingle more freely. Domestication of nature is not only desirable, but necessary for study.

Japanese primatologists are renowned for their ability to recognise animals by sight, and indeed most primates in a research group are usually named and numbered. Comprehensive data on every single subject in a group is a uniquely Japanese trait of primate research. Each member of the primate community has a part to play, and the Japanese researchers are interested in this complex interaction.

For Japanese researchers in primatology, the findings of the team are emphasised over the individual. The study of primates is a group effort, and the group will get the credit for it. A team of researchers may observe a group of primates for several years in order to gather very detailed demographic and social histories.

Notable Japanese primatologists

Kinji Imanishi
Junichiro Itani
Kawai Masao
Tetsuro Matsuzawa
Toshisada Nishida
Satsue Mito

Primatology in sociobiology

Where sociobiology attempts to understand the actions of all animal species within the context of advantageous and disadvantageous behaviors, primatology takes an exclusive look at the order Primates, which includes Homo sapiens. The interface between primatology and sociobiology examines in detail the evolution of primate behavioral processes, and what studying our closest living primate relatives can tell about our own minds. As the American anthropologist Earnest Albert Hooton used to say, "." ("I am a primate; nothing about primates is outside of my bailiwick".) The meeting point of these two disciplines has become a nexus of discussion on key issues concerning the evolution of sociality, the development and purpose of language and deceit, and the development and propagation of culture.

Additionally, this interface is of particular interest to the science watchers in science and technology studies, who examine the social conditions which incite, mould, and eventually react to scientific discoveries and knowledge. The STS approach to primatology and sociobiology stretches beyond studying the apes, into the realm of observing the people studying the apes.

Taxonomic basis

Before Darwin and molecular biology, the father of modern taxonomy, Carl Linnaeus, organized natural objects into kinds, that we now know reflect their evolutionary relatedness. He sorted these kinds by morphology, the shape of the object. Animals such as gorillas, chimpanzees and orangutans resemble humans closely, so Linnaeus placed Homo sapiens together with other similar-looking organisms into the taxonomic order Primates. Modern molecular biology reinforced humanity's place within the Primate order. Humans and simians share the vast majority of their DNA, with chimpanzees sharing between 97-99% genetic identity with humans.

From grooming to speaking

Although social grooming is observed in many animal species, the grooming activities undertaken by primates are not strictly for the elimination of parasites. In primates, grooming is a social activity that strengthens relationships. The amount of grooming taking place between members of a troop is a strong indicator of alliance formation or troop solidarity. Robin Dunbar suggests a link between primate grooming and the development of human language. The size of the neocortex in a primate's brain correlates directly to the number of individuals it can keep track of socially, be it a troop of chimps or a tribe of humans.

This number is referred to as the monkeysphere. If a population exceeds the size outlined by its cognitive limitations, the group undergoes a schism. Set into an evolutionary context, the Dunbar number shows a drive for the development of a method of bonding that is less labor-intensive than grooming: language. As the monkeysphere grows, the amount of time that would need to be spent grooming troopmates soon becomes unmanageable. Furthermore, it is only possible to bond with one troopmate at a time while grooming. The evolution of vocal communication solves both the time constraint and the one-on-one problem, but at a price.

Language allows for bonding with multiple people at the same time at a distance, but the bonding produced by language is less intense. This view of language evolution covers the general biological trends needed for language development, but it takes another hypothesis to uncover the evolution of the cognitive processes necessary for language.

Modularity of the primate mind

Noam Chomsky's concept of innate language addresses the existence of universal grammar, which suggests a special kind of "device" all humans are born with whose sole purpose is language.  Fodor's modular mind hypothesis expands on this concept, suggesting the existence of preprogrammed modules for dealing with many, or all aspects of cognition. Although these modules do not need to be physically distinct, they must be functionally distinct. There was an experiment to teach language to orangutans at the Smithsonian National Zoo using a computer system developed by primatologist Dr. Francine Neago in conjunction with IBM.

The massive modularity theory thesis posits that there is a huge number of tremendously interlinked but specialized modules running programs called Darwinian algorithms, or DA. DA can be selected for just as a gene can, eventually improving cognition. The contrary theory, of generalist mind, suggests that the brain is just a big computer that runs one program, the mind. If the mind is a general computer, for instance, the ability to use reasoning should be identical regardless of the context. This is not what is observed. When faced with abstract numbers and letters with no "real world" significance, respondents of the Wason card test generally do very poorly. However, when exposed to a test with an identical rule set but socially relevant content, respondents score markedly higher. The difference is especially pronounced when the content is about reward and payment. This test strongly suggests that human logic is based on a module originally developed in a social environment to root out cheaters, and that either the module is at a huge disadvantage where abstract thinking is involved, or that other less effective modules are used when faced with abstract logic.

Further evidence supporting the modular mind has steadily emerged with some startling revelations concerning primates. A very recent study indicated that human babies and grown monkeys approach and process numbers in a similar fashion, suggesting an evolved set of DA for mathematics (Jordan). The conceptualization of both human infants and primate adults is cross-sensory, meaning that they can add 15 red dots to 20 beeps and approximate the answer to be 35 grey squares. As more evidence of basic cognitive modules are uncovered, they will undoubtedly form a more solid foundation upon which the more complex behaviors can be understood.

In contradiction to this, neuroscientist Jaak Panksepp has argued that the mind is not a computer nor is it massively modular. He states that no evidence of massive modularity or the brain as a digital computer has been gained through actual neuroscience, as opposed to psychological studies. He criticises psychologists who use the massive modularity thesis for not integrating neuroscience into their understanding.

The primate theory of mind

Primate behavior, like human behavior, is highly social and ripe with the intrigue of kingmaking, powerplays, deception, cuckoldry, and apology. In order to understand the staggeringly complex nature of primate interactions, we look to theory of mind. Theory of mind asks whether or not an individual recognizes and can keep track of information asymmetry amongst individuals in the group, and whether or not they can attribute folk psychological states to their peers. If some primates can tell what others know and want and act accordingly, they can gain advantage and status.

Recently, chimpanzee theory of mind has been advanced by Felix Warneken of the Max Planck Institute. His studies have shown that chimpanzees can recognize whether a researcher desires a dropped object, and act accordingly by picking it up. Even more compelling is the observation that chimps will only act if the object is dropped in an accidental-looking manner: if the researcher drops the object in a way that appears intentional, the chimp will ignore the object.

In a related experiment, groups of chimps were given rope-pulling problems they could not solve individually. Warneken's subjects rapidly figured out which individual in the group was the best rope puller and assigned it the bulk of the task. This research is highly indicative of the ability of chimps to detect the folk psychological state of "desire", as well as the ability to recognize that other individuals are better at certain tasks than they are.

However primates do not always fare so well in situations requiring theory of mind. In one experiment pairs of chimpanzees who had been close grooming partners were offered two levers. Pressing one lever would bring them food and another would bring their grooming partner food. Pressing the lever to clearly give their grooming partner much-wanted food would not take away from how much food they themselves got. For some reason, the chimps were unwilling to depress the lever that would give their long-time chums food. It is plausible but unlikely that the chimps figured there was finite food and it would eventually decrease their own food reward. The experiments are open to such interpretations making it hard to establish anything for certain.

One phenomenon which would indicate a possible fragility of theory of mind in primates occurs when a baboon gets lost.  Under such circumstances, the lost baboon generally makes "call barks" to announce that it is lost. Previous to the 1990s it was thought that these call barks would then be returned by the other baboons, similar to the case is in vervet monkeys. However, when researchers studied this formally in the past few years they found something surprising: Only the baboons who were lost would ever give call barks. Even if an infant was wailing in agony just a few hundred meters away, its mother who would clearly recognise its voice and would be frantic about his safety (or alternatively run towards her infant depending on her own perceived safety), would often simply stare in his direction visibly agitated. If the anguishing baboon mother made any type of call at all, the infant would instantly recognise her and run to her position. This type of logic appears to be lost on the baboon, suggesting a serious gap in theory of mind of this otherwise seemingly very intelligent primate species.  However, it is also possible that baboons do not return call barks for ecological reasons, for example because returning the call bark might call attention to the lost baboon, putting it at greater risk from predators.

Criticisms

Scientific studies concerning primate and human behavior have been subject to the same set of political and social complications, or biases, as every other scientific discipline. The borderline and multidisciplinary nature of primatology and sociobiology make them ripe fields of study because they are amalgams of objective and subjective sciences. Current scientific practice, especially in the hard sciences, requires a total dissociation of personal experience from the finished scientific product (Bauchspies 8). This is a strategy that is incompatible with observational field studies, and weakens them in the eyes of hard science. As mentioned above, the Western school of primatology tries to minimize subjectivity, while the Japanese school of primatology tends to embrace the closeness inherent in studying nature.

Social critics of science, some operating from within the field, are critical of primatology and sociobiology. Claims are made that researchers bring pre-existing opinions on issues concerning human sociality to their studies, and then seek evidence that agrees with their worldview or otherwise furthers a sociopolitical agenda. In particular, the use of primatological studies to assert gender roles, and to both promote and subvert feminism has been a point of contention.

Several research papers on primate cognition were retracted in 2010. Their lead author, primatologist Marc Hauser, was dismissed from Harvard University after an internal investigation found evidence of scientific misconduct in his laboratory.  Data supporting the authors' conclusion that cottontop tamarin monkeys displayed pattern-learning behavior similar to human infants reportedly could not be located after a three-year investigation.

Women in primatology
Women receive the majority of PhDs in primatology. Londa Schiebinger, writing in 2001, estimated that women made up 80 percent of graduate students pursuing PhDs in primatology, up from 50 percent in the 1970s. Because of the high number of women, Schiebinger has even asserted that "Primatology is widely celebrated as a feminist science".

The evolution of primatology
In 1970 Jeanne Altmann drew attention to representative sampling methods in which all individuals, not just the dominant and the powerful, were observed for equal periods of time. Prior to 1970, primatologists used "opportunistic sampling", which only recorded what caught their attention.

Sarah Hrdy, a self-identified feminist, was among the first to apply what became known as sociobiological theory to primates. In her studies, she focuses on the need for females to win from males parental care for their offspring.

Linda Fedigan views herself as a reporter or translator, working at the intersection between gender studies of science and the mainstream study of primatology.

While some influential women challenged fundamental paradigms, Schiebinger suggests that science is constituted by numerous factors, varying from gender roles and domestic issues that surround race and class to economic relations between researchers from developed world countries and the developing world countries in which most nonhuman primates reside.

Changing stereotypes
Darwin noted that sexual selection acts differently on females and males. Early research emphasized male-male competition for females. It was widely believed that males tend to woo females, and that females are passive. For years this was the dominant interpretation, emphasizing competition among dominant males who control territorial boundaries and maintain order among lesser males. Females, on the other hand, were described as "dedicated mothers to small infants and sexually available to males in order of the males' dominance rank". Female-female competition was ignored. Schiebinger proposed that the failure to acknowledge female-female competitions could "skew notions of sexual selection" to "ignore interactions between males and females that go beyond the strict interpretation of sex as for reproduction only". In the 1960s primatologists started looking at what females did, slowly changing the stereotype of the passive female. We now know that females are active participants, and even leaders, within their groups. For instance, Rowell found that female baboons determine the route for daily foraging. Similarly, Shirley Strum found that male investment in special relationships with females had greater productive payoff in comparison to a male's rank in a dominance hierarchy. This emerging "female point of view" resulted in a reanalysis of how aggression, reproductive access, and dominance affect primate societies.

Schiebinger has also accused sociobiologists of producing the "corporate primate", described as "female baboons with briefcases, strategically competitive and aggressive". This contrasts with the notion that only men are competitive and aggressive. Observations have repeatedly demonstrated that female apes and monkeys also form stable dominance hierarchies and alliances with their male counterparts. Females display aggression, exercise sexual choice, and compete for resources, mates and territory, like their male counterparts.

Six features of feminist perspective that characterize contemporary primatology (Fedigan)

 Reflexivity: sensitivity to context and cultural bias in scientific work.
 "The female point of view"
 Respect for nature and an ethic of cooperation with nature
 Move away from reductionism
 Promote humanitarian values rather than national interests
 Diverse community, accessible and egalitarian

Schiebinger suggests that only two out of the six features are characteristic of feminism. One of them is the discussion of the politics of participation and the attention placed on females as subjects of research.

Academic resources

Societies
American Society of Primatologists
European Federation for Primatology
International Primatological Society

Journals
 American Journal of Primatology
Folia Primatologica
 International Journal of Primatology
 Journal of Medical Primatology
 Journal of Human Evolution
Primates

See also
 Physical anthropology
 Primatologists
 Human genetics
 Human evolutionary genetics
 Primate research centers

References

Sources

External links
 World Directory of Primatologists
 Primatologist Biographies
 Primatology.net A community run blog, with contributions from primatology academics and enthusiasts from around the world.